Events from the year 1734 in art.

Events
 Engraving Copyright Act ('Hogarth's Act') in Britain protects original engravings.
 Charles-Joseph Natoire receives his first royal commission, for the Chambre de la Reine at the Palace of Versailles.

Works

 Jean-Baptiste-Siméon Chardin
 The Game of Knucklebones
 The House of Cards
 Charles-Joseph Natoire – Venus Demanding Arms from Vulcan for Aeneas
 Bartolomeo Nazari - Portrait of Farinelli
 Peter Scheemakers – Gilded equestrian statue of King William III (Kingston upon Hull, England)

Births
 January 10 – Giovanni Pichler, German-Italian artist in engraved gems (died 1791)
 March 9
 Marie-Suzanne Giroust, French painter (died 1772)
 Francisco Bayeu y Subías, Spanish painter in the Neoclassical style, primarily of religious and historical themes (died 1795)
 April 1 – Cristoforo Dall'Acqua, Italian painter and engraver (died 1787)
 May 7 – Jean Humbert, Dutch portrait painter (died 1794)
 May 20 – Anton Janša, Slovene apiarist and painter (died 1773)
 July 4 – Jean Henri Riesener, furniture designer (died 1806)
 August 31 – Gaetano Gandolfi, Bolognese painter (died 1802)
 September 3 – Joseph Wright of Derby, British painter (died 1797)
 September 17 – Jean-Baptiste Le Prince, French etcher and painter (died 1781)
 December 15 – George Romney, English painter (died 1802)
 date unknown
 Peter Perez Burdett, English draughtsman (died 1793)
 Samuel Cotes, British painter of miniature portraits and also worked in crayons (died 1818)
 Francesco Antonio Franzoni, Italian sculptor (died 1818)
 Moses Haughton the elder, English designer, engraver and painter of portraits and still life (died 1804)
 Francis Sartorius, painter of horses (died 1804)

Deaths
 February 10 – Jean Raoux, French painter (born 1677)
 March 7 – John Verelst, Dutch Golden Age portrait painter (born 1648)
 May 4 – James Thornhill, English painter (born 1675 or 1676)
 May 15 – Sebastiano Ricci, Italian painter in the Cortonesque style of grand manner fresco painting (born 1659)
 May 27 – Claude Audran III, French painter (born 1658)
 September 13 – Tobias Querfurt, German painter, draughtsman, and engraver (born 1660)
 October 5 - Paolo Alboni, Italian painter (born 1671)
 November - Peter Angelis, French painter (born 1685)
 November 21 – Alexis Simon Belle, French portrait painter (born 1674)
 December 5 – Peter Tillemans, Flemish baroque painter, especially of portraiture, landscapes, and works on sporting and military subjects (born c.1684)
 date unknown
 Giacomo Bolognini, Italian painter of the Baroque (born 1664)
 Pietro Capelli, Italian painter of the Rococo, active in quadratura (born unknown)
 Louis de Chastillon,  French painter in enamel and miniature, and engraver (born 1639)
 Andrea Procaccini, Italian painter for the royal family of Philip V (born 1671)
 Gao Qipei, Chinese painter of landscapes and figures (born 1660)
 Gaetano Sabatini, Italian draftsman and painter (born 1703)
 Cornelis Verelst, Dutch flower painter (born 1667)

 
Years of the 18th century in art
1730s in art